Mark Edward Langston (born August 20, 1960) is an American former Major League Baseball left-handed pitcher. He pitched for the Seattle Mariners (1984–1989), Montreal Expos (1989), California / Anaheim Angels (1990–1997), San Diego Padres (1998), and Cleveland Indians (1999). During a 16-year baseball career, Langston compiled 179 wins, 2,464 strikeouts, and a 3.97 earned run average.

Baseball career
Langston pitched collegiately at San Jose State and was drafted by the Seattle Mariners in the second round of the 1981 Major League Baseball draft. He was chosen as a compensation pick from the Texas Rangers for the signing of Bill Stein. Langston debuted for the Mariners in 1984 with fellow rookie Alvin Davis. Davis' performance won him the American League Rookie of the Year award, but Langston's performance was voted worthy of the Rookie Pitcher of the Year award, as he finished the year with a league-leading 204 strikeouts.

In 1989, the Mariners traded Langston, who was their top pitcher at the time, to the Montreal Expos for a package of three young pitchers: Randy Johnson, Gene Harris and Brian Holman.

In 1990, he pitched the first seven innings for a 2–0 combined no-hitter with Mike Witt. Witt, who had pitched a perfect game back in 1984, tossed the final two frames. This combined no-hitter remained the last one in Angels history until Ervin Santana pitched a no-hitter on July 27, 2011.

Langston was the Angels starting pitcher for the 1995 American League West tie-breaker game. The Seattle Mariners defeated the California Angels to advance to the first regular American League Division Series.

In the 1998 World Series, Langston's 2–2 pitch to Tino Martinez appeared to be over the plate, but was called ball 3; Langston's next pitch was hit for a grand slam in the seventh inning of Game 1 to give the New York Yankees a 9–5 lead.  The Yankees went on to sweep the San Diego Padres in four games.

Noted for his pickoff move to first base, his 91 career pickoffs were, at the time of his retirement, the most in baseball history. Langston is one of only eight pitchers in MLB history to pick off three runners in a single game which he accomplished against the Cubs in 1989. Today, he has the fourth-most pickoffs in baseball history, behind only Kenny Rogers, Terry Mulholland and Andy Pettitte, all of them also left-handed pitchers.

Broadcasting
Langston serves as a radio color commentator for the Los Angeles Angels during all games and is also a co-host of the Angels post-game call-in show Angel Talk on radio station KLAA.

On September 20, 2019, after announcing the starting lineups for an away game against the Houston Astros, Langston suffered from ventricular fibrillation and collapsed in the broadcast booth. He was revived and taken to a hospital, where he later had a defibrillator installed; Jose Mota took over Langston's place in the radio broadcasts. Langston returned to California on September 28 and resumed his Angels radio duties the next day.

Personal life
Right after retirement Langston was the head coach for Lutheran High School of Orange County for two years. 

Langston appeared as himself in an episode of Sabrina, The Teenage Witch, entitled "To Tell a Mortal", where he plays catch with Harvey.

See also
 List of Major League Baseball no-hitters
 List of Major League Baseball annual strikeout leaders
 List of Major League Baseball career strikeout leaders

References

External links

1960 births
Living people
American League All-Stars
Anaheim Angels players
California Angels players
Cleveland Indians players
Montreal Expos players
San Diego Padres players
Seattle Mariners players
Major League Baseball pitchers
Baseball players from Anaheim, California
Gold Glove Award winners
American League strikeout champions
Bellingham Mariners players
Bakersfield Mariners players
Chattanooga Lookouts players
Lake Elsinore Storm players
Buffalo Bisons (minor league) players
San Jose State Spartans baseball players
Baseball players from San Diego
American expatriate baseball players in Canada
Los Angeles Angels announcers